Marcelo Cazaubón Rincón (born 15 April 1992) is a Mexican former footballer.

Club career

CF Monterrey 
He has played only in first division with the Monterrey first team. He was part of the team in 2011 Club World Cup at Japan. He made his senior team debut on August 13, 2011, as a substitute in a match against San Luis in a 1 - 0 loss of Monterrey 
He was sent in loan to Correcaminos from Cd. Victoria in 2012–2013, where he fought the Copa Mx final vs Dorados. He played 21 games in Correcaminos. In 2013, he was sent to Venados at Merida, he played 16 games.

References

He played the last couple of minutes in the game vs Atlas where Monterrey won 2–0.

Concacaf Champions League participation:
Marcelo played the whole first-round game vs Herediano, team from Costa Rica. Monterrey won that game 5-0

External links
 
 Monterrey profile 
 

1992 births
Living people
Sportspeople from Tampico, Tamaulipas
Footballers from Tamaulipas
Association football forwards
C.F. Monterrey players
Correcaminos UAT footballers
Venados F.C. players
Liga MX players
Mexican footballers